Charismatic megafauna are animal species that are large—in the relevant category that they represent—with symbolic value or widespread popular appeal, and are often used by environmental activists to gain public support for environmentalist goals. Examples include tigers, lions, jaguars, hippopotamuses, elephants, gorillas, chimpanzees, giant pandas, brown and polar bears, rhinoceroses, kangaroos, koalas, blue whales, humpback whales, orcas, walruses, elephant seals, bald, white-tailed and eastern imperial eagles, penguins, crocodiles and great white sharks among countless others. In this definition, animals such as penguins or bald eagles can be considered megafauna because they are among the largest animals within the local animal community, and they disproportionately affect their environment. The vast majority of charismatic megafauna species are threatened and endangered by overhunting, poaching, black market trade, climate change, habitat destruction, invasive species, and many more causes.

Use in conservation 
Charismatic species are often used as flagship species in conservation programs, as they are supposed to affect people's feelings more. However, being charismatic does not protect species against extinction; all of the 10 most charismatic species are currently endangered, and only the giant panda shows a demographic growth from an extremely small population.

Beginning early in the 20th century, efforts to reintroduce extirpated charismatic megafauna to ecosystems have been an interest of a number of private and non-government conservation organizations.  Species have been reintroduced from captive breeding programs in zoos, such as the wisent (the European bison) to Poland's Białowieża Forest.
These and other reintroductions of charismatic megafauna, such as Przewalski's horse to Mongolia, have been to areas of limited, and often patchy, range compared to the historic ranges of the respective species.

Environmental activists and proponents of ecotourism seek to use the leverage provided by charismatic and well-known species to achieve more subtle and far-reaching goals in species and biodiversity conservation. By directing public attention to the diminishing numbers of giant panda due to habitat loss, for example, conservation groups can raise support for the protection of the panda and for the entire ecosystem of which it is a part. (The giant panda is portrayed in the logo of the World Wide Fund for Nature.)

Taxonomic bias 
Charismatic megafauna may be subject to taxonomic inflation, in that taxonomists will declare a subspecies to be a species because of the advocacy benefits of a unique species, rather than because of new scientific evidence. The public's preference to identify with species sold through the ecotourism industry may be a factor for creating taxonomic inflation. In the public perception, ecotourism may be about seeing species, and the number of unique species increases the perceived biodiversity and tourism value of an area. A correlation may exist between the taxonomic bias in biodiversity datasets and the charisma of terrestrial megafauna, with the more charismatic species being largely over-reported. However, reports that charismatic megafauna are more engaging to the public than other species have recently been questioned.

See also
Bambi effect

References

Further reading
 
 
 
 

Conservation biology
Wildlife